A regional election took place in Alsace on March 15, 1998, along with all other regions.

Sources

Le Figaro Elections base

1992 elections in France
1992